The Asian Squash Federation was formed on November 29, 1980, at the suggestion of Pakistan and the "First Meeting of Squash Playing Nations of Asia", held in Karachi. The founder members were Bahrain, Bangladesh, Malaysia, Pakistan, Philippines, Singapore, and Thailand.

Pakistan provided the first president, the headquarters, and the secretariat. The principles and objects of the ASF are:

 To serve as the Squash management body in Asia and as such, to promote and assist in the development of the sport among its member countries.
 To uphold and enforce the principal aspects of all organisational and technical rules of the sport, as decided by the World Squash Federation (WSF), and to:
 implement the fundamental regulations for international competitive Squash; and
 maintain a working relationship with the Olympic Council of Asia.
 To maintain the authority and autonomy of its members.
 To protect the common interests of its members through consultation and coordinated effort.
 To collect, collate and circulate information amongst its members.
 To assist members in promoting competitive Squash for the benefit of all member nations of the Federation.
 To arbitrate if circumstances so demand on any Squash-related dispute amongst member countries.

Presidents

List of members

Events
Junior Events
Asian Junior Individual Championships
Asian Junior Team Championships 
Asian Junior Super Series 

Seniors' Events
Asian Individual Squash Championships 
Asian Squash Team Championships 

Masters' Events
Asian Masters Championships

See also
 Asian Games
 Asian Individual Squash Championships
 Asian Squash Team Championships

References

External links
 Asian Squash Federation official website

Squash organizations
Sports governing bodies in Asia
Squash in Asia
World Squash Federation
1980 establishments in Asia